A list of films produced in South Korea in 1964:

External links
1964 in South Korea

 1960-1969 at koreanfilm.org

South Korea
1964
Films